Aldo Visconti (born March 26, 1977) is an Argentine footballer currently playing for Chaco For Ever of the Torneo Argentino A, the regionalised third division in Argentina.

Teams

References
 Profile at BDFA 
 

1977 births
Living people
Argentine footballers
Primera Nacional players
Atlético de Rafaela footballers
San Martín de Tucumán footballers
Chaco For Ever footballers
Boca Unidos footballers
Aldosivi footballers
Club Atlético Tigre footballers
Club Atlético Los Andes footballers
Association football forwards